Fizz & Martina's Math Adventures is a collection of five math-related educational video games for the Windows and Macintosh platforms, developed and published by Tom Snyder Productions. The games were incorporated with the California Learning Assessment System (CLAS). The series consists of Buddies for Life, Blue Falls Elementary, Caves of Blue Falls, Lights, Camera, Fractions! and Project Sphinx.

Development

Educational goals
The series teaches arithmetic, story problems, estimates and operations. The main idea was to teach math as part of a storyline within a narrated slideshow. The movie sequences and challenges catch students' interest and the math problems are meaningful so that they can be used to simulate real life solutions. The material covers four math strategies for assessment, namely Open-ended Problems, Enhanced Multiple-choice Questions, Investigations and Portfolios. They are also designed to reinforce math and to motivate students to learn.

Reception
The Journal felt the series was "mathematically and educationally sound".

Awards

|-
 |
 | Fizz & Martina's Math Adventures 
 | EdPress Distinguished Achievement Award
 |
|-
 |
 | Fizz & Martina's Math Adventures 
 | Software & Industry Association Codie Award Finalist - Best New Curriculum Software for Early Education
 |
|-
 |
 | Fizz & Martina's Math Adventures 
 | Technology & Learning Award of Excellence
 |
|-
 |
 | Fizz & Martina's Math Video Kits 
 | Parents' Choice
 |
|}

References

External links
Official website

1992 video games
MacOS games
Windows games
Children's educational video games
Mathematical education video games
Video games developed in the United States
Video game franchises introduced in 1992